Jacques Tourneur (November 12, 1904 – December 19, 1977) was a French film director known for the classic film noir Out of the Past and a series of low-budget horror films he made for RKO Studios, including Cat People, I Walked with a Zombie, and The Leopard Man. He is also known for directing Night of the Demon, which was released by Columbia Pictures. While in Hollywood, he was usually addressed by his anglicized name "Jack Turner", a literal and phonetic translation of his name in English.

Life
Born in Paris, France, Tourneur was the son of Fernande Petit and film director Maurice Tourneur. At age 10, Jacques moved to the United States with his father. He started a career in cinema while still attending high school as an extra and later as a script clerk in various silent films. Both Maurice and Jacques returned to France after his father worked on the film The Mysterious Island in 1925. Tourneur died in 1977, aged 73, in Bergerac, Dordogne, France.

Career
Tourneur began work as an editor and assistant director. He made his debut as a director on the French film  in 1931. Tourneur went to Hollywood in 1934 where he had a contract with MGM Studios. While working as the second unit director on the film A Tale of Two Cities he met film producer Val Lewton. 

Tourneur made his feature debut as director in the 1939 film They All Come Out. After Tourneur was dropped by MGM in 1941, he was picked up by Lewton to film several acclaimed low-budget horror films for RKO Studios including Cat People and I Walked with a Zombie. 

Cat People, although considered a B movie and made on a limited budget, was distinguished by a style of lighting and cinematography that has been imitated countless times. Tourneur was promoted to the A-list at RKO, directing films including Out of the Past and Berlin Express. In the 1950s, Tourneur became a freelance director, filming various genre films including Wichita, Anne of the Indies, Way of a Gaucho, Nightfall, The Flame and the Arrow, Stars In My Crown and Night of the Demon. His last two films, made for American International Pictures and starring Vincent Price, were The Comedy of Terrors (1963) and War-Gods of the Deep (1965).

After his final days working for film, Tourneur began directing television episodes. Tourneur filmed episodes of The Barbara Stanwyck Show, Bonanza, The Twilight Zone, and The Alaskans. Tourneur's final director credit was for an episode of T.H.E. Cat in 1966. Tourneur then retired and returned to France.

Filmography

Director
Feature films

 All That's Not Worth Love (1931, French)
 Toto (1933, French)
 To Be Loved (1933, French)
 The Concierge's Daughters (1934, French)
 They All Come Out (1938)
 Nick Carter, Master Detective (1939)
 Phantom Raiders (1940)
Doctors Don't Tell (1941)
 Cat People (1942)
 I Walked with a Zombie (1943)
 The Leopard Man (1943)
 Days of Glory (1944)
 Experiment Perilous (1944)
 Canyon Passage (1946)
 Out of the Past (1947)
 Berlin Express (1948)
 Easy Living (1949)
Stars In My Crown (1950)
 The Flame and the Arrow (1950)
 Circle of Danger (1951)
 Anne of the Indies (1951)
 Way of a Gaucho (1952)
 Appointment in Honduras (1953)
 Stranger on Horseback (1955)
 Wichita (1955)
Great Day in the Morning (1956)
 Nightfall (1956)
Night of the Demon (1957)
 The Fearmakers (1958)
 Timbuktu (1959)
 Frontier Rangers (1959)
 Giant of Marathon (1959)
 The Comedy of Terrors (1964)
 War-Gods of the Deep (1965)

Short films

1936 – The Jonker Diamond
1936 – Harnessed Rhythm
1936 – Master Will Shakespeare
1936 – Killer Dog
1937 – The Grand Bounce
1937 – The Boss Didn't Say Good Morning
1937 – The King Without a Crown
1937 – The Rainbow Pass
1937 – Romance of Radium
1937 – The Man in the Barn
1937 – What Do You Think?
1938 – What Do You Think? (Number Three) 
1938 – The Ship That Died
1938 – The Face Behind the Mask
1938 – What Do You Think?: Tupapaoo
1938 – Strange Glory
1938 – Think It Over
1939 – Yankee Doodle Goes to Town
1942 – The Incredible Stranger
1942 – The Magic Alphabet
1944 – Reward Unlimited

TV
 1955-1961 : General Electric Theater, 4 episodes
 1955 : The Martyr
 1955 : Into the Night
 1960 : Aftermath
 1961 : Star Witness: The Lili Parrish Story
 1956 : Fireside Theater, 3 episodes
 1956 : A Hero Returns
 1956 : Kirsti
 1956 : The Mirror
 1957 : Schlitz Playhouse of Stars, 1 episode
 1957 : Outlaw's Boots
 1957 : The Walter Winchell File, 3 episodes
 1957 : The Steep Hill
 1958 : House on Biscayne Bay
 1958 : The Stopover
 1958 : Cool and Lam, CBS Productions
 1958 : Northwest Passage, 8 episodes
 1958 : The Gunsmith
 1958 : The Burning Village
 1958 : The Bond Women
 1959 : The Break Out
 1959 : The Vulture
 1959 : The Traitor
 1959 : The Assassin
 1959 : The Hostage
 1959 : Bonanza, 1 episode
 1960 : Denver McKee
 1959 : The Alaskans, 1 episode
 1960 : The Devil Makers
 1960 : The Barbara Stanwyck Show, 11 episodes
 1960 : The Mink Coat
 1960 : Ironbark's Bridge
 1960 : The Miraculous Journey of Tadpole Chan
 1961 : Frightened Doll
 1961 : The Choice
 1961 : Sign of the Zodiac
 1961 : Adventure on Happiness Street
 1961 : The Golden Acres
 1961 : Confession
 1961 : Dragon by the Tail
 1961 : Dear Charlie
 1962 : Adventures in Paradise, 1 episode
 1962 : A Bride for the Captain
 1962 : Follow the Sun, 1 episode
Sergeant Kolchak Fades Away
 1963 : The Twilight Zone, 1 episode
 1963 : Night Call
 1966 : T.H.E. Cat, 1 episode
 1966 : The Ring of Anasis

Assistant director or editor
 1929 : Le Navire des hommes perdus (Das schiff der verlorenen menschen), directed by Maurice Tourneur
 1930 : Accusée, Levez vous, directed by Maurice Tourneur
 1931 : Maison de danses, directed by Maurice Tourneur
 1931 : Partir, directed by Maurice Tourneur
 1932 : Au nom de la Loi, directed by Maurice Tourneur 
 1932 : Les Gaités de l'escadron, directed by Maurice Tourneur (Editor)
 1933 : Les Deux Orphelines, directed by Maurice Tourneur (Editor)
 1993 : Lidoire, directed by Maurice Tourneur. 
 1933 : Obsession, directed by Maurice Tourneur (uncredited)
 1933 : La Fusée, directed by Jacques Natanson (Editor)
 1933 : Le Voleur, directed by Maurice Tourneur
 1934 : Rothchild, directed by Maurice Tourneur (Editor)
 1935 : A Tale of Two Cities, directed by Jack Conway, war sequences, (séquence de la prise de la Bastille).

Posterity
La Mort en direct (1980), film by Bertrand Tavernier is dedicated to deceased film director Jacques Tourneur

”There are films that watch us grow old ” Serge Daney. Quoted by Serge Le Péron in (Jacques Tourneur Le Médium), film by Alain Mazars, 2015. 

By naming the main character Jessica Holland in his film Memoria (2021),  Apichatpong Weerasethakul pays tribute to Jacques Tourneur’s film I Walked with a Zombie.

References

Bibliography
 
 
 Jacques Tourneur, The Cinema of Nightfall, Chris Fujiwara, The Johns Hopkins University press 2007.

Further reading
Young, Gwenda (2001) 'Shadows: Jacques Tourneur's Cinema of Ambiguity'. Film Ireland, 83 (*):47–51. 	
Young, Gwenda (1999) 'Jacques Tourneur's World War II Films: From Unity to Chaos'. Popular Culture Review, 10 (2):55–65.
Young, Gwenda (1998) 'The Cinema of Difference: Jacques Tourneur, Race and I Walked with a Zombie (1943)'. ''Irish Journal of American Studies, 7:101–121.

External links

 
 

1904 births
1977 deaths
Film directors from Paris
French emigrants to the United States
Horror film directors